Japanese in MangaLand (マンガで日本語) is a series of educational books by Marc Bernabe designed to help teach Japanese using original, untranslated manga. Originally published in Spanish as Japonés en viñetas, it has since had translated versions published in English, German, French, Catalan, Italian, and Portuguese. There are three main books along with two workbooks.

Kanji in MangaLand (マンガで漢字) is a series for learning 1,006 basic kanji (ideogram) characters.

Publications

Japanese in MangaLand series
Japanese in MangaLand: Learning the Basics/Japanese in MangaLand: Basic Japanese Course Using Manga:
1st edition by Japan Publications Trading (Japanese in Mangaland: Learning the Basics/Japanese in Mangaland: Basic Japanese Course Using Manga) (/):
?th impression (2004-03-12)
Bilingual (Spanish/Japanese) edition by Norma Editorial Sa (Japonés en viñetas: Curso basico de japonés a traves del manga) (/)
?th impression (2007-07-30)
Japanese in MangaLand: Workbook 1:
Japan Publications Trading edition (/)
?th impression (2006-11-03)
Japanese in MangaLand 2: Basic to Intermediate Level:
Bilingual edition by Japan Publications Trading (/):
?th impression (2005-09-02)
Japanese in MangaLand 3: Intermediate Level:
1st edition by Japan Publications Trading (/):
?th impression (2006-04-07)

Kanji in MangaLand series
Kanji in MangaLand Volume 1
bilingual edition (/)
?th impression (2007-11-16)
Kanji in MangaLand Volume 2: Basic to Intermediate Kanji Course through Manga
bilingual edition (/)
?th impression (2009-10-04)

References

See also
 Japanese the Manga Way
 Mangajin

Japanese language learning resources
Series of books
Book series introduced in 2004
Publications established in 2004